Loxostege wagneri is a moth in the family Crambidae. It was described by Zerny in 1929. It is found in Turkey.

References

Moths described in 1929
Pyraustinae